Qinghemen District is a district of Fuxin City, Liaoning province, People's Republic of China.

Administrative divisions
There are four subdistricts and two towns within the district.

Subdistricts:
Xinbei Subdistrict, Liutai Subdistrict, Aiyou Subdistrict, Qinghe Subdistrict

Towns:
Wulongba, Hexi

References

External links

County-level divisions of Liaoning